is a passenger railway station located in the city of Ōzu, Ehime Prefecture, Japan. It is operated by JR Shikoku and has the station number "S14".

Lines
Only local trains stop at the station. Connections with other services are needed to travel further east of Matsuyama on the line.

Layout
The station, which is unstaffed, consists of two opposed side platforms serving two tracks. The station building is unstaffed and serves only as a waiting room. Access to the opposite platform is by means of a level crossing.

History
The station started operations on February 14, 1918. On 16 July 1928, the station location was moved to its present location. Ehime Railways was nationalized on 1 October 1933 and Japanese Government Railways (JGR) assumed control, renamed it Iyo-Shirataki and operated the station as part of the Ehime Line. With the privatization of JNR on 1 April 1987, the station came under the control of JR Shikoku.

Surrounding area
Shirataki Park - located about 400 m from the station. The station name Iyo-Shirataki comes from the Shirataki waterfall (白滝) found in the park.

See also
 List of railway stations in Japan

References

External links
Station timetable

Yosan Line
Railway stations in Ehime Prefecture
Railway stations in Japan opened in 1918
Ōzu, Ehime